Sidney Aparecido Ramos da Silva (born 24 December 1982), commonly known as Sidão, is a Brazilian professional  footballer who plays as a goalkeeper.

Club career
Born in São Paulo, Sidão was a Corinthians youth graduate. After failing to appear with the main squad, he would spend the most of his career playing mainly for lower sides in the same state.

Audax
On 28 June 2012 Sidão joined Audax. With the side he was mainly used as a backup, but after the injury of the starter Felipe Alves in 2016, he was promoted as first-choice and appeared regularly as his club reached the Campeonato Paulista finals for the first time in its history.

Botafogo (loan)
On 24 May 2016, Sidão was loaned to Botafogo until the end of the year.

São Paulo
On 24 November 2016, Sidão signed a two-year contract with São Paulo. Sidão would be a key player for São Paulo in 2017 Florida Cup. He defended four penalties, two ones at semifinals against Argentine side River Plate and two other ones at final against fierce rivals Corinthians. He felt herself impressed after figuring out he broke Rogério Ceni's, his coach, record: Ceni defended two penalties in his two first matches for Tricolor. This way, São Paulo won 2017 Florida Cup, and Sidão was considered best player on final.

Goiás
On 13 December 2018 Goiás signed a one-year contract with Sidão, on a free transfer. In March 2019, he drew controverse after saying that his move to Goiás was a step down on his career.

Vasco da Gama (loan)
On 4 May 2019, Sidão joined Vasco da Gama on a loan deal to replace the injured goalkeeper Fernando Miguel. On 12 May, after a bad performance in a 3–0 loss against Santos, he was ironically voted as the Man of the Match with near 90% of the votes in an open online poll led by Rede Globo, being awarded a trophy afterwards. The prank was followed by sympathy from professional footballers, clubs and former footballers, leading to a public apology from the television network.

References

External links

1982 births
Living people
Brazilian footballers
Footballers from São Paulo
Association football goalkeepers
Campeonato Brasileiro Série A players
Campeonato Brasileiro Série C players
Sport Club Corinthians Paulista players
Clube Atlético Juventus players
Sampaio Corrêa Futebol Clube players
Rio Claro Futebol Clube players
Luverdense Esporte Clube players
Grêmio Barueri Futebol players
Associação Desportiva Recreativa e Cultural Icasa players
Grêmio Osasco Audax Esporte Clube players
Guaratinguetá Futebol players
Audax Rio de Janeiro Esporte Clube players
Botafogo de Futebol e Regatas players
São Paulo FC players
Goiás Esporte Clube players
CR Vasco da Gama players